Colonel William Benedict Nolde (August 8, 1929 – January 27, 1973) was an officer in the United States Army. Born in Menominee, Michigan, Nolde was a professor of military science at Central Michigan University before joining the army.  He is known for being the last official American combat casualty of the Vietnam War: the 45,914th confirmed death and 57,597th in the total list of Americans killed during the conflict. Nolde was killed by artillery fire eleven hours before the cessation of all hostilities in accordance with the Paris Peace Accords.

Military career
Nolde was drafted into the U.S. Army and served in the Korean War. After the war he stayed in the Army where he underwent officer training and served a first tour in South Vietnam in 1965. After returning from a posting in Italy in June 1972 he was asked by Army Chief of Staff William Westmoreland to return to South Vietnam as a military adviser to the Army of the Republic of Vietnam. Lt Col. Nolde became the senior military adviser in Bình Long Province. On 27 January 1973, eleven hours before the ceasefire under the Paris Peace Accords was to come into effect, Nolde was killed by North Vietnamese artillery fire near An Lộc.

While other Americans lost their lives after the truce was enacted, these were not recorded as combat casualties. During his time in the armed forces, he accumulated four medals, including the Bronze Star Medal and Legion of Merit. In 1997, Nolde was one of the first members inducted into the Central Michigan University Reserve Officer's Training Corps Hall of Fame. In 2006, Colonel Nolde was inducted into the Fort Sill Artillery Officer Candidate School Hall of Fame.

Lecture Series

The William B. Nolde Lecture Series has the purpose to promote an understanding of the role of the United States Armed Forces in the life and history of the United States and to recognize the tie between military science and the broader disciplines within the university.  The lectures serve as a stimulus to intellectual activity for future leaders both in the military and across the Central Michigan University campus and community. This program is sponsored by the university's Military Science Department. The following are the lectures presented:

Nolde Scholarship
At Central Michigan University, the William B. Nolde Scholarship was established in memory of Colonel William B. Nolde by students, family and friends.

Burial
Nolde was buried on February 5, 1973 in Section 3 of Arlington National Cemetery (his widow Joyce was buried beside him in 2005). As the last official combat casualty, his funeral was broadcast on television and was attended by "considerably more brass than the funeral of a field-grade officer would normally command" including General Alexander Haig and President Richard Nixon.

Awards and decorations
   Legion of Merit
   Bronze Star
   Purple Heart
   Air Medal
   Vietnam Service Medal
   Vietnam Campaign Medal

References

External links
 Official Website of William Benedict Nolde at Colonel William B. Nolde
 Official Legacy of Colonel William B. Nolde at The Warriors Roadtrip Network.
 William Benedict Nolde at ArlingtonCemetery.net, an unofficial website
 

1929 births
1973 deaths
People from Menominee, Michigan
American military personnel killed in the Vietnam War
Military personnel from Michigan
Recipients of the Legion of Merit
United States Army colonels
Recipients of the Air Medal
Burials at Arlington National Cemetery
United States Army personnel of the Korean War
United States Army personnel of the Vietnam War